Nilan de Silva (born 28 June 1971) is a Sri Lankan former cricketer. He played 67 first-class matches for various domestic teams in Sri Lanka between 1990 and 2001. He is now an umpire and stood in a tour match during Australia's tour to Sri Lanka in July 2016 and in matches in Sri Lanka's 2016–17 Premier League Tournament.

References

External links
 

1971 births
Living people
Sri Lankan cricketers
Sri Lankan cricket umpires
Colombo Cricket Club cricketers
Moors Sports Club cricketers
Sebastianites Cricket and Athletic Club cricketers
Tamil Union Cricket and Athletic Club cricketers
Cricketers from Colombo